"Me Traicionaste" is a song recorded by Spanish singer Rosalía and Peruvian singer-songwriter A.Chal. It was released on April 26, 2019 through Columbia Records simultaneously with the Game of Thrones companion soundtrack, For the Throne: Music Inspired by the HBO Series.

Background 
On April 9, 2019, it was announced that the iconic HBO show Game of Thrones would have its own companion soundtrack. The soundtrack was set to be released on April 26, 2019, two weeks later than the show's eighth season premiere.

Critical reception 
Ryan Dombal of Pitchfork praised the track and Rosalía's performance in an otherwise highly negative review of its parent album, stating that it "offers a dark, piercing sensuality" and "comes close to matching the shadowy Game of Thrones mood millions have fallen for," but was highly critical of A.Chal's "pointless" verse. Danny Schwartz of Highsnobiety expressed a similar sentiment, writing that the Peruvian rapper spoiled the lead artist's "exquisite flamenco". Stefanie Fernández, writing for NPR, called the track a "soundtrack standout" due to its production and "uncanny relevance to Arya Stark and her kill list", while Billboard'''s Judy Cantor-Navas described it as "darkly intriguing." GQ'' placed the song on its weekly best songs list, with Colin Groundwater calling it a "solid slow burner that continues the Spanish pop star's winning streak."

Release history

References 

2019 songs
Music of Game of Thrones
Rosalía songs
Songs written by Rosalía
Songs written by el Guincho